The Odell House is a historic home located at Greenburgh, Westchester County, New York, United States.  During the American Revolutionary War, the Odell farm served as headquarters of Count de Rochambeau and campsite for the French expeditionary forces under his command from July 6 to August 18, 1781.

Description and history
The house consists of a -story central section erected in 1732, with flanking wings.  The east wing was built in 1765 as a -story structure and raised to a full two stories in 1785. The central section and east wing are of wood-frame construction, covered with cedar wood shingles, and rest on a fieldstone foundation. The 2-story stone west wing was built between 1853 and 1855.   The house features three divided Dutch doors.
It was added to the National Register of Historic Places in 1973.
In 2020, the house was deeded to the Town of Greenburgh, NY. Along with the newly formed non-profit, the Friends of Odell House Rochambeau Headquarters (www.odellrochambeau.org), they are working to restore the property and create a Museum. Construction began March 2021 and is expected to last two years.

See also

 List of historic houses
 List of historic sites preserved along Rochambeau's route
 National Register of Historic Places listings in southern Westchester County, New York
 Washington–Rochambeau Revolutionary Route

References

Greenburgh, New York
Historic places on the Washington–Rochambeau Revolutionary Route
Houses completed in 1732
Houses in Westchester County, New York
Houses on the National Register of Historic Places in New York (state)
New York (state) in the American Revolution
Sons of the American Revolution
National Register of Historic Places in Westchester County, New York
1732 establishments in the Province of New York